Violet Helen Carson, OBE (1 September 1898 – 26 December 1983) was a British actress of radio, stage and television, and a singer and pianist, who had a long and celebrated career as an actress and performer during the early days of BBC Radio, and during the last two decades of her life as the matronly Christian widow, town gossip and elderly battle-axe Ena Sharples in the ITV television soap opera Coronation Street. She was one of the original characters from the series debut in 1960 and would feature in the role for twenty years.

Early life and career 
Carson was born on German Street in Ancoats, Manchester. Her Scottish father, William Brown Carson, ran a flour mill and her mother, Mary Clarke Carson ( Tordoff), was an amateur singer. As a child, she took piano lessons while attending a Church of England school and performed with her younger sister Nellie as a singing act called the Carson Sisters. In 1913, she became a cinema pianist providing the musical accompaniment for silent films. As silent films fell out of fashion following the arrival of "talkies", Carson took up singing.

She married road contractor George Peploe on 1 September 1926, her 28th birthday. Peploe died in 1929 at the age of 31. They had no children and Carson never remarried. The premature death of Peploe mirrored the early life of Carson's iconic character Ena Sharples many years later; in the years long before the show was created, Ena's fiancé had died in World War I, and her husband died prematurely in 1937.

Radio and theatre career
In 1935, Carson joined BBC Radio in Manchester, singing a range of material from comic musical hall style songs to light operatic arias. She began in a show called Songs at the Piano and was a regular member of Children's Hour on the BBC Home Service and was the star of Nursery Sing Song from Manchester, in which she frequently sang with producer Trevor Hill, many years her junior. Contrary to popular opinion, she was never known as "Auntie Vi", that epithet belonging only to Violet Fraser in the 1920s. "I was never anyone's aunt," Carson exclaimed when Hill produced a BBC Radio programme about her in 1981. She worked with the Council for the Encouragement of Music and the Arts during the Second World War and was for six years the pianist for the Mabel and Wilfred Pickles radio show Have A Go.

Her extensive radio career included a period as a presenter and interviewer on Woman's Hour for five years and she acted in numerous radio dramas. It was while recording a children's programme in 1951 that she first worked with Tony Warren, who would later be the creator of Coronation Street. Her stage career included playing the Duchess of York in William Shakespeare's tragedy Richard III.

Coronation Street 

Carson is best remembered for her role as Ena Sharples, the flint-faced and gruff moral voice of Coronation Street, a role she played from 1960 to 1980. In 1962, she was named ITV Personality of the Year for her portrayal of Ena. 

For much of her time on the programme, Sharples' moralising caused her to spar regularly with Elsie Tanner (Patricia Phoenix). She appeared in the first episode, which aired on 9 December 1960. Long after her departure from the programme and after her own death, Carson continues to be synonymous with the hairnet that Ena chose to wear for almost every occasion. As a singer, Carson was in the soprano range and was a regular on the Christian hymnal programme Stars on Sunday during its ten-year run from 1969.

On 14 February 1968, Carson sailed from Southampton on the Orient Lines liner Oriana, bound for Australia. She arrived in Fremantle on 6 March 1968 and Melbourne on 9 March. Thousands of Australians greeted her on the docks. On 22 March 1968, she attended the 10th Annual TV Week Logie Awards (named after John Logie Baird) at the Southern Cross Hotel in Melbourne, where she presented awards to some of the winners that year.

During the 1970s, Carson suffered from ill health, and only played Ena sporadically throughout the decade. She was absent from Coronation Street for most of 1974 after suffering a stroke.

In April 1980, Carson made what would ultimately be her final appearance in Coronation Street. A storyline involving Ena moving to Lytham St. Annes to stay with a friend while her flat at the street's community centre was being renovated, was aired. When the character returned, the flat was not ready and Ena announced on screen (to characters Ken Barlow and Albert Tatlock) that she would return to her flat — but only if she felt like doing so. It was at this point that Carson became ill with pernicious anaemia and was forced to leave the programme, although at the time it was anticipated that she would return at some stage. However, this did not happen and all subsequent storylines involving Ena were shelved due to Carson's poor health, although Ena was not written out.

Carson lived in a bungalow in Bispham, Blackpool, with her sister Nellie, and refused to make any public appearances after her retirement. The year after she retired, Carson underwent surgery for an abscess from which she never fully recovered.

Death 

Carson died of heart failure on Boxing Day 1983 at the age of 85. She was cremated at Carleton Crematorium, Blackpool, and is commemorated at Bispham Parish Church in Blackpool.

A memorial service dedicated to Carson was held at Manchester Cathedral in January 1984 and was attended by several of her Coronation Street colleagues including William Roache (Ken Barlow).

Honours 
Carson was made an Officer of the Order of the British Empire in 1965 and had a rose cultivar named after her ('Violet Carson', McGredy 1964). Wax statues of her are held at Madame Tussauds in London and Blackpool. She switched on the Blackpool Illuminations in 1961.

Carson is commemorated by a blue plaque outside Granada Studios in Manchester, where she filmed the majority of her work as Ena Sharples.

Selected filmography

References

Further reading 
Over the Airwaves [Chapter 9] by Trevor Hill (the Book Guild) (2005)

External links 

1898 births
1983 deaths
Actresses from Manchester
English film actresses
English women pianists
English soap opera actresses
English stage actresses
English television actresses
British radio actresses
British radio personalities
Officers of the Order of the British Empire
People from Ancoats
People from Blackpool
20th-century English actresses
20th-century English women singers
20th-century English singers
20th-century British pianists
Children's Hour presenters
British women radio presenters
English people of Scottish descent
Woman's Hour
20th-century women pianists